Xu Xing (c. 372 – c. 289 BC) was a Chinese philosopher and one of the most notable advocates of the egalitarian political philosophy of agriculturalism. With a group of followers he settled in the state of Teng in about 315 BC. A disciple of his visited the Confucian philosopher Mencius, and a short report of their conversation discussing Xu Xing's philosophy survives.

References

4th-century BC Chinese philosophers
Agriculturalism
Chinese political philosophers
Philosophers from Shandong
Zhou dynasty philosophers
372 births
372 deaths